Henri Justamant (29 March 1815 in Bordeaux – 2 Januari 1893 in Saint-Maur-des-Fossés) was a French choreographer and dancer.

He was a dancer in the Bordeaux Ballet in 1836 and later maître de ballet (master of ballet) in Lille between 1839 and 1840, Lyon from 1849 until 1851 and again from 1858 until 1861.  In the same year, he became director of the Théâtre de la Monnaie in Brussels until 1864.  From 1868 until 1869, he was director of the Paris Opera Ballet.

Choreographies
His choreographies were at the city of his directorship.
 Le Guerz enchanté, ou le Joueur de biniou (performed at Lyon on February 20, 1851, and at Brussels on March 10, 1862)
 Les Bohémiens contrebandiers (performed at Lyon on March 31, 1851)
 Les Cosaques (performed on April 22, 1854)
 Lore-Ley, ou la Fée du Rhin (performed on January 23, 1856)
 Le Corsaire (performed on February 17, 1857)
 Une fille du ciel (performed at Lyon on March 10, 1858, and Brussels on September 1, 1861)
 Quasimodo ou la Bohémienne (performed on December 6, 1859)
 Fleurs et papillons (performed on October 22, 1860)
 Les Néréides, ou le Lac enchanté (performed on March 11, 1861)
 Les Contrebandiers (performed on October 19, 1861)
 Le Fils de l'alcade (performed on November 21, 1861)
 Un bal travesti (performed on January 24, 1862)
 Les Songes (performed on December 22, 1862)
 Le Royaume des fleurs (performed on May 6, 1863)
 Flamma (performed on December 19, 1863)
 Les Amardyades (performed on February 1, 1864)
 L'Étoile de Messine (performed on March 21, 1864)
 Les Nymphes amazones (performed on May 26, 1864)
 Les Fugitifs (performed on July 17, 1868)
 Faust (performed on March 3, 1869)
 Ballet des Erynnies (performed on May 19, 1876)
 Les Folies espagnoles (performed on April 30, 1885)
 Ophélia (performed in June 1887)

References 

 Sarah Gutsche-Miller, Parisian Music-Hall Ballet, 1871-1913. Boydell & Brewer 2015. p. 307.
 Gabi Vettermann, In Search of Dance Creators’ Biographies: The Life and Work of Henri Justamant, in Les Choses Espagnoles: Research Into the Hispanomania of 19th Century Dance. Epodium 2009.

Entertainers from Bordeaux
1815 births
1893 deaths
19th-century French ballet dancers
French ballet masters
French choreographers
French male ballet dancers
Paris Opera Ballet artistic directors